Senegal competed at the 2019 African Games held from 19 to 31 August 2019 in Rabat, Morocco. In total, athletes representing Senegal won one gold medal, five silver medals and 16 bronze medals and the country finished in 22nd place in the medal table.

Medal summary

Medal table 

|  style="text-align:left; width:78%; vertical-align:top;"|

|  style="text-align:left; width:22%; vertical-align:top;"|

Athletics 

Louis François Mendy won the bronze medal in the men's 110 metres hurdles event, the only medal won by an athlete representing Senegal in athletics.

Henry Bandiaky competed in the men's 100 metres and men's 200 metres. In both events he did not advance to the semifinals.

Boxing 

Four athletes represented Senegal in boxing: Marietou Diallo, Mamadou Fall, Mbagnick Ndiaye and Khadija Timera.

Canoeing 

Senegal competed in canoeing. Oulimata Ba Fall and Combe Seck were among the canoeists to represent Senegal and they won three silver medals and one bronze medal.

Equestrian 

Batj Gaye, Salif Keita, Babacar Ngom and Mohamed Seck represented Senegal in equestrian events.

Fencing 

Senegal competed in fencing and, in total, fencers representing Senegal won four bronze medals.

Football 

Senegal's national under-20 football team competed at the 2019 African Games. They won the bronze medal in the men's tournament.

Handball 

Senegal was scheduled to compete in handball at the 2019 African Games but ultimately did not compete.

Judo 

Ten athletes represented Senegal in judo.

Mbagnick Ndiaye won the gold medal in the men's +100 kg event and Monica Sagna won a bronze medal in the women's +78 kg event.

Karate 

Senegal competed in karate. Fallou Beye won bronze in the Men's Kumite -60kg event, Abdou Cisse won bronze in the Men's Kumite -84kg event and the women's team won bronze in the Women's Kumite team event.

Shooting 

Clement Fakhoury, Hassane Ramlaoui and Hassan Saleh competed in the men's skeet event.

Swimming 

Six athletes represented Senegal in swimming.

Men

Women

Mixed

 Legend: (*) = Swimmers who participated in the heat only.

Table tennis 

Ibrahima Diao, Mohamed Gueye and Hamidou Sow are scheduled to compete in table tennis.

Taekwondo 

Senegal competed in Taekwondo.

Triathlon 

Mamadou Diop finished in 9th place in the men's event.

Hamadel Nestor Ndiaye finished in 15th place in the men's event.

Anta Ndiaye finished in 10th place in the women's event.

Sall Adji Mame Awa finished in 15th place in the women's event.

Volleyball 

Senegal's women's national volleyball team competed in the women's volleyball tournament at the 2019 African Games.

Wrestling 

Senegal competed in wrestling. In total, wrestlers representing Senegal won one silver medal and one bronze medal and the country finished 7th in the wrestling medal table.

References 

Nations at the 2019 African Games
2019
African Games